Solariella delicatus is a species of sea snail, a marine gastropod mollusk in the family Solariellidae.

Description
(Original description by W.H. Dall) The height of the shell attains 7 mm, its diameter 6.5 mm. The small, white shell has about four well rounded whorls exclusive of the rather promment minute glassy nucleus. The suture is distinct, almost appressed. The spiral sculpture shows a prominent thread at the shoulder, two with an intercala smaller thread at the verge of the umbilicus and numerous feeble minute elevated lines under-running the axial sculpture. The umbilicus is narrow and deep. The axial sculpture consists of very numerous, equal, regularly spaced low lamellae, with (on the body whorl) about equal interspaces, extending to the verge of the umbilicus and minutely beading the shoulder cord. The circular aperture is hardly interrupted by the body. The margins are thin and sharp.

Distribution
This marine species occurs off the Philippines, Japan and the Kuriles.

References

 Kantor Yu.I. & Sysoev A.V. (2006) Marine and brackish water Gastropoda of Russia and adjacent countries: an illustrated catalogue. Moscow: KMK Scientific Press. 372 pp. + 140 pls.
 Hasegawa K. (2009) Upper bathyal gastropods of the Pacific coast of northern Honshu, Japan, chiefly collected by R/V Wakataka-maru. In: T. Fujita (ed.), Deep-sea fauna and pollutants off Pacific coast of northern Japan.  National Museum of Nature and Science Monographs 39: 225-383.
 Williams S.T., Smith L.M., Herbert D.G., Marshall B.A., Warén A., Kiel S., Dyal P., Linse K., Vilvens C. & Kano Y. (2013) Cenozoic climate change and diversification on the continental shelf and slope: evolution of gastropod diversity in the family Solariellidae (Trochoidea). Ecology and Evolution 3(4): 887–917

External links
 To World Register of Marine Species
 

delicatus
Gastropods described in 1919